The term World Series of Soccer was initially a series of senior international soccer matches held by USSF between 1991 and 1994.

In 2005, Major League Soccer re-introduced the name for a series of professional matches in the United States.

U.S. roster

National Team player pool for the 1991 World Series of Soccer:

1991
In 1991, the United States Soccer Federation (USSF), established and promoted a series of national team games between the United States men's national soccer team and other national soccer teams.  The goal was to provide U.S. soccer players on the national team an opportunity to play high level competitive soccer.  The collapse of the North American Soccer League had removed the ability of U.S. players getting meaningful outdoor experience.  While indoor soccer was booming, USSF didn't see it as an adequate replacement for outdoor competition when it came to preparing players for international outdoor soccer.

Results
May 5  San Diego California  United States  1-0  Uruguay
 Vermes  (Henderson)-26

May 19  Stanford Stadium Palo Alto  United States  0-1  Argentina
 

June 1  Foxboro Stadium Foxborough   United States  1-1 Ireland
 Wynalda  (Henderson)-68

November 24. Texas Stadium Irving   United States  1-1 Costa Rica
 Kinnear  (Murray)-6

1992

Results

May 30, 1992   RFK Stadium Washington    United States 3–1 Ireland (match part of 1992 U.S. Cup)
 Balboa, Ramos, Harkes,

June 3, 1992   Soldier Field Chicago   United States 1–0 Portugal (match part of 1992 U.S. Cup)
 Wegerle

June 6, 1992   Soldier Field Chicago   United States 1–1 Italy (match part of 1992 U.S. Cup)
 Harkes

1993
In 1993, USSF resurrected the World Series of Soccer to prepare the national team for the 1994 FIFA World Cup.  As the host nation, the U.S. did not need to qualify.  Therefore, USSF sought other games to provide the team with competitive experience.

Results
Jan 30  United States  2-2  Denmark  
 Murray, Moore

Feb 13  United States  0-1  Russia  

Feb 21  United States  0-0  Russia 

May 8  United States  1-2  Colombia
 Lalas

June 6   Yale Bowl New Harven    United States  0-2  Brazil (match part of 1993 U.S. Cup)

June 9   Foxboro Stadium Foxborough    United States  2-0  England (match part of 1993 U.S. Cup)
 Dooley, Lalas

June 13   Soldier Field Chicago    United States 3-4  Germany (match part of 1993 U.S. Cup)
 Dooley (2), Stewart

1994
In 1994, the U.S. national team played three matches in Ohio, billed by USSF as part of the World Series of Soccer:

Results
May 21, 1994  United States 2-3  Bayern Munich
 Klopas-(Unassisted)-21
 Klopas-(C. Jones)-37

May 25  United States  0-0  Saudi Arabia 

May 28  United States  1-1  Greece
 Klopas-(Caligiuri)-45

International association football competitions hosted by the United States
1991 in American soccer
1992 in American soccer
1993 in American soccer
1994 in American soccer